Ilaiyangudi is a state assembly constituency in Sivaganga district in Tamil Nadu.

In 2008, under a Delimitation of Parliamentary and Assembly Constituency Order, the Ilaiyangudi assembly constituency was merged with Manamadurai.

Members of Legislative Assembly

References

Election results

2006

2001

1996

1991

1989

1984

1980

1977

1971

1967

External links
 

Former assembly constituencies of Tamil Nadu
Sivaganga district